The Economic and Financial Affairs Council (ECOFIN) is one of the oldest configurations of the Council of the European Union and is composed of the economics and finance ministers of the 27 European Union member states, as well as Budget Ministers when budgetary issues are discussed.

ECOFIN often works with the European Commissioner for Economic and Financial Affairs and the President of the European Central Bank.

Tasks
The Council covers a number of EU policy areas, such as economic policy coordination, economic surveillance, monitoring of Member States' budgetary policy and public finances, the euro (legal, practical and international aspects), financial markets and capital movements and economic relations with third countries. It also prepares and adopts every year, together with the European Parliament, the budget of the European Union which is about €145 bn.

Decision making
The council meets once a month and decides mainly by qualified majority, in consultation or codecision with the European Parliament, with the exception of fiscal matters which are decided by unanimity. When the Ecofin Council examines dossiers related to the euro and EMU, the representatives of the Member States whose currency is not the euro do not take part in the vote of the council.

ECOFIN delegates some of its tasks to the Code of Conduct Group.  For example, that Group has resolved issues of tax policy on Jersey, Gibraltar and other "dependent or associated territories", and investigated the UK Patent Box tax treatment.

See also
 Code of Conduct Group
 Eurogroup (finance ministers only of the eurozone states)
 List of acronyms: European sovereign-debt crisis

References

External links
 About the Economic and Financial Affairs Council
Press releases of the Economic and Financial Affairs Council

Council of the European Union
Finance in the European Union